Aghasadyg Aghaali oglu Garaybeyli (15 March 1897, Shamakhi – 5 December 1988, Baku) was a Soviet and Azerbaijani actor.

Life and contributions
Garaybeyli was born in the city of Shamakhi, but like many natives of that city at the time, he found himself in Baku after the devastating earthquake of 1902. Garaybeyli became an orphan at a young age and was brought up by a foster family. While still in school, he started attending drama clubs for actors-to-be established by Huseyn Arablinski. He made his first stage appearance in 1917. Beginning in 1921, with the help of Uzeyir Hajibeyov, he started attending courses in professional acting. It was also when Garaybeyli got married. In the following years, he acted in over 200 different roles, including both stage and film appearances. Garaybeyli was also known as a voice actor in a number of movies. From 1933 until the end of his life, he worked in the Azerbaijan State Drama Theatre. In 1940 he was awarded the title of People's Artist of Azerbaijan.

He died in Baku, four months before his 92nd birthday.

Filmography
The Maiden Tower (1924), as Ayan 
Haji Gara (1929), as Asgar bey
Sevil (1929), as Balash
Fatali Khan (1947), as Sardar's envoy
Bakhtiar (film) (1955), as Aghabala
If Not This One, Then That One (1957), as Rustam bey
Under the sultry sky (1957), as Sardarov
Leyli and Majnun (1961), as Ibn Khalid
Life Is Beautiful, Brother! (1967), as Shukru bey
The Mail Box (1967), as the Khan
Stars Don't Go Out (1971), as Gendarme
The Boys of Our Street (1973), as Rustam kishi
Aghasadyg Garaybeyli (1974), as himself
The Tour (1975), as CEO (not credited)
The Graduate Thesis (1979), as the Reeve
I Am Composing a Song (1979), as Abdulla
The Prayer (1982), as the Mullah
The Grandchild of My Grandchild's Grandchild (1985), as the Grandfather

References

See also
List of People's Artists of the Azerbaijan SSR

1897 births
1988 deaths
People from Shamakhi
Communist Party of the Soviet Union members
People's Artists of the Azerbaijan SSR
Recipients of the Order of Lenin
Recipients of the Order of the Red Banner of Labour
Azerbaijani male stage actors
Azerbaijani male film actors
Soviet Azerbaijani people
Burials at II Alley of Honor